, born Kim Sung-jong is a Korean-Japanese serial rapist who may have raped between 150 and 400 women. In October 2000, he was charged with drugging, raping and killing the British woman Lucie Blackman, the rape and manslaughter of the Australian woman Carita Ridgway, and the rape of eight other women. 

In 2007, Obara was jailed for life on multiple rape charges and manslaughter, but was acquitted of Blackman's rape and murder for lack of direct evidence. In December 2008, the Tokyo High Court found Obara guilty on the counts of abduction, dismemberment and disposal of Blackman's body. Blackman's death, as well as Obara's trial, received extensive press coverage internationally, especially in Britain.

Background
Joji Obara was born on 10 August 1952 to Zainichi Korean parents in Osaka. During his youth, Obara's father worked his way from scrap collector to immensely wealthy owner of a string of properties and pachinko parlors. Obara was educated at private Tokyo schools, and received daily tutoring in a variety of subjects. At age 15, he enrolled in a prestigious prep school affiliated with Keio University, virtually guaranteeing his acceptance into the university. Two years later, after his father's death in Hong Kong, Obara inherited property in Osaka and Tokyo. After traveling extensively and graduating from Keio University with degrees in politics and law, he became a naturalized Japanese citizen and legally changed his name. Obara invested heavily in real estate speculation, gaining assets estimated as much as $38 million. After losing his fortune and his firm in the 1990s recession, he was pursued by creditors, and reportedly used his business as a money laundering front for the yakuza syndicate Sumiyoshi-kai.

Crimes
Obara was a drug user who was reported to have a fixation on white women (who were often viewed as status symbols in Japan). He developed a pattern of criminal behavior, beginning with unlawfully administering drugs to render his victims unconscious and abduct and rape them. Obara victimized women of both Japanese and Western backgrounds. He recorded his attacks on videotape, at least 400 of which were recovered by police, giving them cause to believe that he might have raped anywhere from 150 to 400 women. Police found extensive journals in which Obara made reference to "conquest play", a euphemism describing his sexual assaults on women whom he wrote were "only good for sex" and on whom he sought "revenge on the world" drugging them with chloroform.

Carita Ridgway
Carita Simone Ridgway (March 3, 1970 February 29, 1992) was an Australian model from Claremont, Perth, Western Australia, who was working in Tokyo's Ginza area as a bar hostess to earn money for acting school. Common in East Asian nations, "hostess" in this sense describes a modern form of geisha entertainer, i.e. young women at bars who are paid to engage in conversation with men, light their cigarettes, sing karaoke, and sometimes dance with a strict policy against men touching the hostesses or making sexual propositions. Popular hostesses often receive drinks, presents and social invitations from their favourite customers.

Ridgway, who was offered a lift by Obara, was drugged; this led to chloroform-related liver failure and brain death. Obara's culpability was exposed when, while using an alias (Nishita), he had taken an unconscious Ridgway to the hospital claiming that she was suffering from shellfish (oyster)-related food poisoning. Ridgway died after life-support was stopped at her family's request; she was then cremated and repatriated to Australia. The cause of death was initially deemed hepatitis E, and there was no support for an investigation by the embassy or Japanese police as requested by the family. Police searched Obara's home and found a diary entry that read, "Carita Ridgway, too much chloroform", and a videotape of Obara raping Ridgway.

Lucie Blackman
Lucie Jane Blackman (September 1, 1978 July 1, 2000) was a British woman from Sevenoaks, Kent, who worked as a hostess in Tokyo. Blackman had previously worked as a flight attendant for British Airways and went to Japan to see the world and earn money to repay her debts. At the time of her death, she was working as a hostess at Casablanca, a nightclub later known as Greengrass, in Roppongi, Tokyo. On July 1, she went on a dōhan (paid date) with a Casablanca customer. Other than a few calls to a friend during the date, no one heard from her again.

Blackman's family, wanting to find her, flew to Tokyo and started a high-profile media campaign. They approached British foreign secretary Robin Cook, who was visiting Tokyo at that time. Newspapers started publicizing Blackman's disappearance on July 13, when British prime minister Tony Blair mentioned the case during an official visit to Japan, where he met with Japanese prime minister Yoshiro Mori. An information hotline was staffed by British expatriates, and an anonymous businessman funded a reward of £100,000. As a result of the publicity surrounding the case, three foreign women came forward to describe waking up sore and sick in Obara's bed, with no memory of the night before. Several of them had reported him to Roppongi police, but were ignored. It was also around this time that police made the connection between cases via the man known as Nishita and Obara.

The body had been cut into 10 pieces and put inside separate bags, her head shaved and encased in concrete. The body was too decomposed to show the cause of death. According to Obara's indictment, he made Blackman a drink containing a drug before raping her at a condominium in Zushi, then killed her. Obara has maintained his innocence, claiming the drugs were voluntarily self-administered.

Trial
In October 2000, Obara was charged with drugging, raping and killing Blackman, as well as with raping eight other women and the manslaughter of Ridgway. His trial began on July 4, 2001. On April 24, 2007, he was found guilty of multiple rape charges and manslaughter, but was acquitted of Blackman's rape and murder for lack of direct evidence. Evidence supporting his guilt of rape included the approximately 400 videos shot by Obara, which showed him engaged in date rape (including one with Ridgway). For the charge of manslaughter, the prosecutor produced an autopsy report showing traces of chloroform in Ridgway's liver and a paper trail showing that Obara accompanied her to the hospital before she died. In Blackman's case, however, the prosecutor could not produce any forensic evidence linking Obara to her death. Her cause of death could not be determined.

Blackman's father, Tim Blackman, accepted £450,000 in mimaikin (condolence money) from a friend of Obara's. Blackman's other family members were opposed to accepting the money. A trust, using some of this money and promoting personal safety, was established in Blackman's name. The judge stated that in deciding on the sentence he did not attach much importance to Obara's payment of "consolation money" to a number of his victims.

The former prosecutor Takeshi Tsuchimoto criticised the decision to acquit Obara for the murder of Blackman by pointing to the conviction of Masumi Hayashi due to circumstantial evidence. The public prosecutor, however, appealed the Blackman-related verdicts, as crucial forensic evidence had not been heard at the original trial, and on March 25, 2008, an appeal trial commenced in the Tokyo High Court. The court found Obara guilty on the counts of abduction, dismemberment and disposal of Blackman's body on December 16, 2008. In early December 2010, the Supreme Court of Japan rejected Obara's appeal and upheld his life sentence.

The Japanese judicial system received criticism for its handling of the case. It is believed that the police did not take this missing person case seriously "because Lucie was working illegally in a job from which women often flee without notice". As a result, the discovery of the body came too late to determine the cause of death. The verdict, by a panel of three judges, cited the lack of forensic evidence as a reason for acquittal. Some foreign media from common law countries also criticised the police for having leaked information to the press.

Media
 On February 29, 2008, ABC News aired a US documentary titled Vanished in Japan related to the two deaths.
People Who Eat Darkness: The Fate of Lucie Blackman a February 2011 book by Richard Lloyd Parry.
 On February 24, 2019, Casefile True Crime Podcast aired an episode revisiting the case.
 RedHanded Podcast: Episode 9, “The Beast With The Human Face”

See also
 List of serial rapists
 Murder of Lindsay Hawker

References

External links
 The 'beast with a human face' BBC profile of Joji Obara
 Safety Text
 Lucie Blackman Trust
 "The man-shaped hole" by Donald Eubank

1952 births
Living people
20th-century Japanese criminals
21st-century Japanese criminals
Japanese people convicted of manslaughter
Japanese people of Korean descent
Japanese prisoners sentenced to life imprisonment
Keio University alumni
Male criminals
Naturalized citizens of Japan
People convicted of kidnapping
Japanese people convicted of rape
Prisoners sentenced to life imprisonment by Japan